The Environmental Health Coalition (EHC) is an organization founded in 1980 by Diane Takvorian and Tony Pettina, and includes a staff of 19 other individuals. Its goal is to achieve environmental and social justice in San Diego, California. Its work mainly concerns low income communities and communities of color in San Diego. It also works to affect public policy both locally and nationally. The coalition believes that by working closely with communities, it will be able to help mitigate the excessive amounts of pollution and other environmental hazards such as hazardous air pollution (HAPs), toxic waste disposal facilities, or superfund sites. One of its main goals is to prevent environmental injustice in San Diego and use that work to influence national environmental justice issues. Its mission statement is as follows:

“Environmental Health Coalition is dedicated to achieving environmental and social justice. We believe that justice is accomplished by empowered communities acting together to make social change. We organize and advocate to protect public health and the environment threatened by toxic pollution. EHC supports broad efforts that create a just society and fosters a healthy and sustainable quality of life.”

History 
The Environmental Health Coalition was founded in 1980 originally under the name Coalition Against Cancer. The initial focus of the EHC was to clean up toxic waste sites like the 38th and Alpha street dumps. In 1983, EHC launched the Household Toxics Project, which focuses on identifying and removing harmful toxins in houses in local San Diego residences. In 1986, the EHC co-sponsored the Tijuana Toxics Conference, and in the same year, launched the Toxic Free Neighborhoods and Clean Bay Campaigns. In 1994, the EHC launched SALTA (Salud Ambiental Lideres Tomando Accion or Environmental Health Leaders Taking Actions), which aimed to train locals in environmental health and justice. In 1996, the EHC protested the housing of nuclear aircraft carriers in the San Diego Bay. In 2000, the EHC worked to draft the Military Responsibilities Act, and in 2002, it formed the Tijuana affiliate. In 2005, it got polluting diesel trucks banned on Barrio Logan streets, and in 2006, it worked with the state to ban candies that had unhealthy traces of lead in them. In 2010, the EHC got the West Side National City Specific Plan approved, and  oversaw energy stimulus money going towards San Diego residents on low income.

Diane Takvorian is one of the founders of the EHC. She has been the executive director since 1982 and holds a master's degree in Social Work with a focus in public policy. She has served on advisory boards at the state, national, and international level and is part of the Joint Public Advisory Committee for the NAFTA Commission for Environmental Cooperation. Tony Pettina is the other founder of the EHC. From 1980 to 2006, he served as the treasurer of the board of directors.

Beliefs and Goals 
The Environmental Health Coalition works to promote social and environmental justice initiatives through community involvement. It places an emphasis on policies involving public health and sustainability.

The EHC aims to prevent and eliminate disproportionate distribution and placement of sources of toxic pollution in underprivileged communities. The coalition works to inform the community members about the dangers and tangible effects of pollution on quality of life in order to encourage individual activism. The EHC believes that the general public has a right to be informed of and involved with local democratic decision making. In addition, the EHC advocates for  government intervention to create change in policies which aim to serve the protection of human and environmental rights. These policies are used to place stricter limits on corporation activity in order to increase accountability. The coalition also intends to widen their scope of influence by building relationships with other organizations which share EHC's ideology. In this way, the EHC aims to work on a local, state, and national level in addressing social and environmental issues.

The EHC has established its Theory of Social Change, which states that its work must be focused towards creating a lasting change through a shared political ideology, active support, analyzing their actions, and strengthening their organization. The EHC hopes to implement its mission through the use of grassroots campaigns to eliminate consequences of toxic pollution, discriminatory land use, and unsustainable energy policies.

Community Based Participatory Research (CBPR) 
The Environmental Health Coalition was part of a Community Based Participatory Research (CBPR) and was tasked with helping to determine the effects of industry in Old Town National City, CA, United States. The CBPR was a study that investigated linkages between community focused work and policy development. The EHC believes that its research has led the way for a media focused campaign to increase the awareness of the problems that the community faced. It was able to utilize quantitative and qualitative data to increase the community's awareness. In this way, the EHC tries to give the residents of Old Town a better understanding of the policy that affects them, as well as alternatives to these policies.

Collaboration and Activism Initiatives

The National City Food Desert 
For over 10 years, the EHC has worked with the Old Town National City Community in an effort to improve food security in the area. The area is established as a food desert, which is defined as "part of the country vapid of fresh fruit, vegetables, and other healthy whole foods"14. The residents of the city have voiced their feelings and opinions on the lack of readily available and healthy food. Because of their food desert status, residents are prone to disease and obesity15. In all of San Diego, National City has the highest rate of heart attacks16.Together with the EHC, the community has reached out to officials to establish a city garden to combat food insecurity found within the city. A community garden has been considered as option to combat the food insecurity13. The EHC intends to continue working with Old Town so that they longer have food desert status.

Truck Ordinance for Barrio Logan 
In 2018, the EHC achieved its goal of cleaner air and public health in Barrio Logan by reducing the frequent heavy duty truck activity on the nearby streets. Before the ordinance was unanimously passed, the residents of Barrio Logan had dealt with the ongoing air and noise pollution. The residents of Boston Avenue in Barrio Logan participated in a traffic survey, which showed that up to 59 heavy duty vehicles will drive down Boston Avenue in a given 2-hour period.

The effort to reduce the effects the diesel-powered machines were causing was led by David Alvarez, chair of the San Diego Environment Committee. Though the policy has been in effect for some time, it currently does not prohibit the use of diesel trucks on all the streets. This still leaves structures such as, schools, retirement homes, and residential areas at risk of exposure to harmful contaminants like ultra-fine particulate matter. The EHC has advocated for the implementation of stricter penalties and enforcement for future reference. They recommend a truck route.

The Arroyo Alamar Preservation Initiative 
The Arroyo Alamar river originates from Eastern San Diego County and is one of Tijuana's last native wildlife hotspots. Human emissions has led to a decline in biodiversity, including the loss of habitats for waterfowl, mammals, marine life, amphibians, and crustaceans. The area is also known for maintaining air quality within the surrounding area due to the few green spaces found here. The EHC have been working to preserve the land and to prevent further construction and habitat destruction by hosting educational tours for the community in order to generate public awareness.

Environmental Health & Justice Focused Initiatives

Transit for All 
San Diego's transit system plays an important role for families, economy, health, and environment. However, many working families in San Diego County are struggling to access job opportunities, visit the doctor, and get groceries due to how inaccessible and unreliable the current transit system is. In the San Diego region, passenger and light light-duty vehicles are the largest contributor of Greenhouse emissions, but adding more transit systems can reduce that. The EHC and the San Diego Transportation Equity Working Group are working to find ways to have a more reliable and accessible transit system while reducing greenhouse gas emission and lung- damaging air pollution. Along with these goals, it meets the need of any person of race and class espically the low-income communities of color in Barrio Logan, City Heights, and National City. The MTS Board of Directors have already approved a plan to transition to 100% bus electrification by 2040. They are starting this plan by prioritizing having pollution-free buses in communities that have experienced the most impacts of greenhouses emissions.

10 Transit Lifelines 
Through the EHC and local residents of San Diego organizing and advocacy for environmental justice to insure for a healthier and more sustainable communities, the 10 Transit Lifelines, a San Diego County regional plan was created. The 10 Transit Lifelines are goals of reducing greenhouses gas emissions, decrease lung-damaging air pollution, and meets the needs of the low-income communities of color separated into 10 categories. The first transit lifeline focuses on environmental justice where there is unlimited access to public transit to all residents of San Diego due to the lack of public transit accesses especially in low-income color communities. The second transit is investing in young people by implementing more youth program that allows them to have access to transportation without any problems. The transit lifeline 3 focuses on improving bus frequency by having bus service every 10 minutes because on average it takes about 30 minutes to an hour for a bus to get to a person. Transit lifeline 4 is having a Blue Line Express which a transit system that will operate 24 hours allowing more access to the trolley and can ensure people to get to their important appointments and places on time. Transit lifeline 5 is having service 24 hours for all public transit systems. Transit lifeline 6 is having a purple line transit system that connects from City Heights to Sorrento Valley allowing communities to connect to help boost economic prosperity. Transit lifeline 7 is achieving the goal of having an all-electric fleet by 2030 to help prevent further air pollution. Transit lifeline 8 is focusing on having anti-displacement strategies where there is no more increase on rent and more transit since many working families had to move to a neighborhood with less public transit options due to increasing rent and housing pricing. Transit Lifeline 9 focuses on having restroom access at San Diego's major transit stations because dignity and hygiene are important. Transit lifeline 10 has a goal of establishing an emergency transit system where it protects resident living near hazardous sites during disasters. In case of a disaster, there should be safety procedures involving public transit to help evacuate residents.

Microparticles in Landscaping Tool Fumes 
Many landscaping workers in California experience migraines that they accredit to exhaust from gas powered leaf blowers, lawn mowers, etc. While the state of California is strict about air quality regulations, some gas-powered machines remain unregulated. There appears to be little push from the government to strictly enforce clean air policies. In addition to this there is also little research on the subject. Some machines are claimed to be updated and safer but still emit dangerous SMOG particles and gases. The EPA stated that pollution levels from these machines are on the same level as some sedans and could be as harmful or more so as cars by 2020. Some of these machines can emit particles smaller than 0.1 micron in size4. Particles like these can cause cancer and lung disease and are unregulated by the government. Masks for these particles and fumes are available but may not be very accessible for workers in poor communities and some of the masks don't account for some of the more harmful fumes like benzene. The EHC is currently assisting landscaping workers in bringing legislation to their local governments4.

Lead Pollution Clean Up in San Diego School 
Lead pollution in schools is a common problem in San Diego County. There were several schools in a mainly Latinx community that were unaware of the presence of lead in their water systems. As for the children and adults that were exposed, there is little to be done medically about lead poisoning. These children and adults are at risk of brain damage, slow learning, and poor behavioral problems. Houses in this community are also plagued with lead in their water, paint, toys, etc. The EHC and residents know lead to be prevalent because most of the neighborhood's buildings were built before 1978. The EHC was in charge of the investigation and damage control of this lead poisoning outbreak. They notified residents of medical risks, and recommended methods for lead detection.

Local Politics Initiatives

Barrio Logan 
Barrio Logan is a neighborhood in San Diego that is concentrated with waste and recycling facilities, an interstate running through it, and an outdated city plan. The community of Barrio Logan is in the process of notifying the local government of these issues with the help of the EHC. The Office of Environmental Health Hazard Assessment and EPA developed a method of screening called CalEnviroScreen 3.0 and determined that Barrio Logan has a disproportionate number of pollution sources in their neighborhood. City planners and local government drafted a new plan, disregarding the communities' ideas and inputs. The neighborhood voted against the city planners' version, so no resolution was reached and the city plan from 1978 remains. They are still making an effort to gain momentum for their 2013 plan, and are still trying to reach a resolution.

The Community Based Home Lead Inspection Project 
San Diego County has a high emissions history. Most of their pollution comes from physical plants and cars. The city reported on their decreased emissions from the 1980s to the present. The tracked emissions do not include diesel because of monitoring differences, but the county still oversees 3000+ facilities that emit some sort of air pollution. These facilities include engine factories, auto body shops, dry cleaners, and gas stations. Higher emitting facilities are required to send out reports on their emissions every two years to keep track of any changes. The State Office for Environmental Health Hazard Assessment also changed its standards to include women and young children. The county sends out notifications to residents in the case of emission changes even if they are not currently detrimental. They are making an effort to keep the people informed about what is going on in their environment.

References

Environmental health organizations